Wachi Assembly constituency is one of the 85 constituencies of Jammu and Kashmir Legislative Assembly in the Indian-administered union territory of Jammu and Kashmir. Wachi  is a part of Shopian, a hill district of the union territory.

Members

Election results

2014

References

External links

Jammu and Kashmir district portal

Assembly constituencies of Jammu and Kashmir
Shopian district